Dimitrios Anastasopoulos (born 11 April 1990) is a Greek professional footballer who plays for Charavgiakos as a midfielder.

Career
Anastasopoulos began playing professional football with Panionios. He also played for Kavala and AEK Athens.
In August 2013, Anastasopoulos signed a contract with German 3. Liga club SSV Jahn Regensburg. Anastasopoulos helped Mont-Royal Outremont win the 2015 PLSQ Championship missing only two matches due to yellow card limit bans. He scored three goals.

Honours

Mont-Royal Outremont
PLSQ Championship: 2015

References

External links
 
Dimitrios Anastasopoulos at Guardian Football
Dimitrios Anastasopoulos at Onsports.gr 

1990 births
Living people
Panionios F.C. players
Kavala F.C. players
AEK Athens F.C. players
SSV Jahn Regensburg players
Anagennisi Karditsa F.C. players
Super League Greece players
3. Liga players
Première ligue de soccer du Québec players
Association football midfielders
CS Mont-Royal Outremont players
Footballers from Athens
Greek footballers